The 2013 British Athletics Championships was the national championship in outdoor track and field for athletes in the United Kingdom, held from 12–14 July at Alexander Stadium in Birmingham. It was organised by UK Athletics. It served as a selection meeting for the 2013 World Championships in Athletics.

Medal summary

Men

Women

References 

2013 British Championships. UK Athletics. Retrieved 2020-01-15.

External links
British Athletics website

British Outdoor Championships
British Athletics Championships
Athletics Outdoor
British Athletics Championships
Sports competitions in Birmingham, West Midlands
2010s in Birmingham, West Midlands